Matthew Rotherham  (born 1994) is a British male track cyclist. Following a career as an elite abled bodied cyclist, he transferred to Paralympic track cycling as a sighted pilot in the visually impaired (B) classification. In 2021, he piloted Neil Fachie to Paralympic gold in the men's track time trial B classification. The pair are also Commonwealth Games champions in 2018, and five-time World champions in the discipline.

Cycling career
Rotherham is a five times British champion after winning the time trial Championship at the 2019 British National Track Championships and the 2022 British National Track Championships and three British National Tandem Sprint Championships gold medals.

He also piloted Neil Fachie of Scotland to gold medals at the 2018 Commonwealth Games in the tandem sprint B and tandem 1km time trial B.

Rotherham was appointed Member of the Order of the British Empire (MBE) in the 2022 New Year Honours for services to cycling.

References

1994 births
Living people
British male cyclists
British track cyclists
Sportspeople from Wigan
English track cyclists
Cyclists at the 2018 Commonwealth Games
Cyclists at the 2020 Summer Paralympics
Medalists at the 2020 Summer Paralympics
Commonwealth Games medallists in cycling
Commonwealth Games gold medallists for Scotland
Paralympic cyclists of Great Britain
Paralympic gold medalists for Great Britain
Members of the Order of the British Empire
21st-century British people
Medallists at the 2018 Commonwealth Games